K'illimani (Aymara k'illima coal, -ni a suffix, "the one with coal", also spelled Killimani) is a  mountain in the Bolivian Andes. It is located in the La Paz Department, Sud Yungas Province, Irupana Municipality.

References 

Mountains of La Paz Department (Bolivia)